This article lists songs about New York City, which are either set there or named after a location or feature of the city. It is not intended to include songs where New York is simply "name-checked" along with other cities.

0–9

A

B

C

D

E

F

G

H

I

J

K

L

M

N

O

P

Q

R

S

T

U

V

W

Y

Z

The Zolas - “Fell in Love with New York”

References

New York City
Songs
 
Songs